Events from the year 1923 in Taiwan, Empire of Japan.

Incumbents

Central government of Japan
 Prime Minister: Katō Tomosaburō, Yamamoto Gonnohyōe

Taiwan 
 Governor-General – Den Kenjirō, Uchida Kakichi

Births
 15 January – Lee Teng-hui, President of the Republic of China (1988-2000)
 2 December – Shih Chun-jen, Minister of the Department of Health (1986–1990)

References

 
Years of the 20th century in Taiwan